Call My Agent: Bollywood is an Indian drama web series based on the French TV series Call My Agent!. The Netflix show is directed by Shaad Ali, written by Hussain Dalal and Abbas Dalal.

Cast

Main 
Aahana Kumra as Amal
Ayush Mehra as Mehershad
Rajat Kapoor as Monty
Soni Razdan as Treasa
Radhika Seth as Nia

Recurring 

 Tinnu Anand as Soumyajit Dasgupta
 Priyasha Bhardwaj as Sonia
 Rohan Joshi as Jignesh
 Merenla Imsong as Nancy
Anuschka Sawhney as Jasleen
Suchitra Pillai as Suchitra
Raghav Lekhi as Sid
Aban Deohans as Stuti

Special appearances
Dia Mirza as herself
Ali Fazal as himself
Richa Chadda as herself
Lara Dutta as herself
Sarika as herself
Akshara Haasan as herself
Lillete Dubey as herself
Ila Arun as herself
Farah Khan as herself
Tigmanshu Dhulia as himself
Jackie Shroff as himself
Nandita Das as herself
Sameer Saxena as himself
Hussain Dalal as himself

Episodes

Season 1 (2021)

References

External links
 
 

2021 Indian television series debuts
Hindi-language Netflix original programming